Zeism is any condition attributed to excessive use of maize (corn) in the diet, such as pellagra. Maize is low in zinc, niacin, and tryptophan, and the limited niacin found in maize is not absorbed in the digestive tract unless it has been treated with alkalis, as in the preparation of tortillas. A type of pellagra attributed to amino acid imbalance is common in India among people who eat a millet with a high leucine content. The deficiencies are usually seasonal.

The (now confirmed) zeist hypotheses that pellagra might be a deficiency disease related to corn consumption was stated in 1810 by the Italian Giovanni Battista Marzari.

See also
Vitamin deficiency

Sources
Primary sources
Dorland's Illustrated Medical Dictionary
The Merck Manuals Online Medical Library - Niacin Deficiency
Encyclopedia of Neurological Disorders: Vitamin/Nutritional Deficiency

Secondary sources
Wilson, Jean D. "Deficiency States". In Harrison's Principles of Internal Medicine, ed. Anthony S. Fauci, et al. New York: McGraw-Hill, 1997.
Garrison, Robert H., Jr. and Elizabeth Somer. The Nutrition Desk Reference. Keats Publishing, Inc., 1985.

References

Nutritional diseases